The Trenton Gas Field is located in east central Indiana and the most western portion of west central Ohio. The field was discovered in 1876, but the size and magnitude of the field was not known until the 1880s. The field also contained the first giant oil reserve discovered in the United States, with an estimated  of oil. The discovery led to the Indiana Gas Boom.

Almost all of the natural gas was removed from the field by 1910, but only about 10% of the oil had been removed at that point. The lack of pressure caused by the removal of the gas led to a complete stoppage of oil production, even though an estimated  of oil remained in the field. Beginning in the late 20th century, oil production resumed at a slow pace after advances in artificial lift technology.

Oil and gas production from this field led the Standard Oil Company to establish refinery operations in Indiana. The firm's production and refinery interests led, in turn, to Standard's Indiana interests being grouped together after the 1911 breakup of the firm due to antitrust action, leading to the formation of the Standard Oil Company of Indiana.

See also

Trenton Limestone
Petroleum industry in Ohio

Notes

Sources

Energy in Indiana
Oil fields of the United States
Energy in Ohio